László Szabados (11 April 1911 – 17 October 1997) was a Hungarian swimmer who competed in the 1932 Summer Olympics. In the 1932 Olympics he won a bronze medal in the 4×200 m freestyle relay event.

References

External links
 

1911 births
1997 deaths
20th-century Hungarian people
Hungarian male swimmers
Olympic swimmers of Hungary
Swimmers at the 1932 Summer Olympics
Olympic bronze medalists for Hungary
World record setters in swimming
Olympic bronze medalists in swimming
Hungarian male freestyle swimmers
European Aquatics Championships medalists in swimming
Sportspeople from Subotica
Medalists at the 1932 Summer Olympics